The 2022 Lamar Cardinals football team represented Lamar University in the 2022 NCAA Division I FCS football season. The Cardinals played their home games at Provost Umphrey Stadium in Beaumont, Texas, and competed in the Southland Conference following an early return from the Western Athletic Conference.  On July 11, 2022, Lamar announced that they would take an early transition back to the Southland Conference after the athletic department announced back in April 2022 a transition back to the conference for the 2023 season.

The Cardinals finished the season with a 1–10 overall record, and were 1–5 in Southland Conference play. They were led by third-year head coach Blane Morgan.  Their October 29 conference victory over the Nicholls Colonels ended a 15 game losing streak dating back to September 25, 2021.

Previous season

The Cardinals finished the season with a 1–9 overall record.  They were 0–4 in Western Athletic Conference play and were 0–6 in the WAC/ASUN Challenge.

Preseason

Recruiting
Sources:

Incoming transfers

The Cardinals added 4 transfer players.

Incoming high school recruits
Lamar signed 25 high school recruits with 16 signed on Early Signing Day and 9 added on National Signing Day.

Preseason poll
The Southland Conference released their preseason poll on July 20, 2022. The Cardinals were picked to finish seventh in the conference.

Coaching staff and roster

Schedule

Game summaries

Abilene Christian

Statistics

SMU

Statistics

Northern Colorado

Statistics

Northwestern State

Statistics

Houston Christian

Statistics

No. 10 Incarnate Word

Statistics

Prairie View A&M

Statistics

Nicholls Colonels

Statistics

Southeastern Louisiana

Statistics

New Mexico State

Statistics

McNeese

Statistics

References

Lamar
Lamar Cardinals football seasons
Lamar Cardinals football